The 2008–09 ISU World Standings, are the World Standings published by the International Skating Union (ISU) during the 2008–09 season.

The 2008–09 ISU World Standings for single & pair skating and ice dance, are taking into account results of the 2006–07, 2007–08 and 2008–09 seasons.

World Standings for single & pair skating and ice dance

Season-end standings 
The remainder of this section is a complete list, by discipline, published by the ISU.

Men's singles (185 skaters)

Ladies' singles (211 skaters)

Pairs (88 couples)

Ice dance (147 couples)

See also 
 ISU World Standings and Season's World Ranking
 List of highest ranked figure skaters by nation
 List of ISU World Standings and Season's World Ranking statistics
 2008–09 figure skating season

References

External links 
 International Skating Union

ISU World Standings and Season's World Ranking
Standings and Ranking
Standings and Ranking